Regular Joe is an American sitcom that aired from March 28 until April 18, 2003 on ABC.

Premise
Widower Joe Binder runs a family-owned hardware store while four generations of the Binder family live under his roof.

Cast
Daniel Stern as Joe Binder
Judd Hirsch as Baxter Binder
John Francis Daley as Grant Binder
Kelly Karbacz as Joanie Binder
Brian George as Sitvar

Episodes

References

External links
 

2003 American television series debuts
2003 American television series endings
2000s American sitcoms
American Broadcasting Company original programming
English-language television shows
Television shows set in New York City
Television series by ABC Studios